Myrica hartwegii, known by the common names Sierra sweet bay and Sierra bayberry, is a species of shrub in the bayberry family.

Description

The leaves are widely lance-shaped to oval with blunt tips. They are up to about 10 cm long and about 3 wide, and they are usually edged with a few shallow teeth. They have scattered hairs and are densely coated in resin glands.

The male and female flowers are arranged in separate spikelike inflorescences. The spherical, slightly waxy fruit is just under 2 mm wide and is dotted with glands.

References

External links
Jepson Manual Treatment
Flora of North America
UC Photo gallery

hartwegii
Endemic flora of California
Flora of the Sierra Nevada (United States)
Flora without expected TNC conservation status